David W. Dunlap (born 1952) is an American journalist who worked as a reporter for The New York Times. He wrote a regular column, Building Blocks, that looked at the New York metropolitan area through its architecture, infrastructure, spaces, and places.

Career
Born in San Francisco, California, on May 10, 1952, Dunlap extensively documented the rebuilding of the World Trade Center after the September 11 attacks in 2001. He began writing about landmarks in 1981, when he was evicted from the New York Biltmore Hotel so that he would not be able to see its interior being demolished.

He began his career as a clerk to James Reston in 1975, became a graphics editor in 1976, and  then reporter in 1981. Between 1994 and 1999, Dunlap covered gay, lesbian, and AIDS issues for The New York Times. He was the first reporter to officially cover the "gay and lesbian beat". The New York Times decided to officially document news about gay and lesbian communities after the AIDS-related death of Times reporter Jeffrey Schmalz in November 1993. Dunlap was sometimes criticized for covering the news from a politically left-leaning position. He retired from The Times in December 2017.

Dunlap is currently documenting the history of Provincetown, Massachusetts, through its architecture, on the website Building Provincetown 2020, which is under construction.

Awards
Dunlap won the Citation of Excellence award from the American Institute of Architects. In 1992, he received the American Planning Association's New York Metro Chapter journalism award; other winners have included Brendan Gill, Paul Goldberger, Kenneth T. Jackson, and Elizabeth Kolbert.

Books
 From Abyssinian to Zion: A Guide to Manhattan's Houses of Worship.  Columbia University Press, 2004.
 On Broadway: A Journey Uptown Over Time. Rizzoli International, 1990.
 Glory in Gotham: Manhattan's Houses of Worship: A Guide to Their History, Architecture and Legacy.  City and Company, 2004.
Building Provincetown: A Guide to Its Social and Cultural History, Told Through Its Architecture. Town of Provincetown, Provincetown Historical Commission, 2015.
The City Observed: New York, by Paul Goldberger. Random House, 1979. (Dunlap was the photographer.)

See also
 LGBT culture in New York City
 List of LGBT people from New York City
 National September 11 Memorial & Museum

References

American architecture writers
American male journalists
American newspaper reporters and correspondents
American gay writers
American LGBT journalists
LGBT people from New York (state)
Living people
The New York Times columnists
Place of birth missing (living people)
Yale University alumni
1952 births
21st-century LGBT people